Walter David Avalos Amarilla (born 8 February 1976) is a Paraguayan footballer who played in Colombia, Chile and Venezuela as well as his native Peru. He made 11 appearances for the Peru national team.

Titles
 Olimpia 1998, 1999 and 2000 (Paraguayan Championship)

External links
 Profile at BDFA 
 
 
 

1976 births
Living people
Sportspeople from Asunción
Paraguayan footballers
Paraguayan expatriate footballers
Paraguay international footballers
Paraguayan Primera División players
Chilean Primera División players
Peruvian Primera División players
Categoría Primera A players
Club Nacional footballers
Club Olimpia footballers
Club Tacuary footballers
12 de Octubre Football Club players
Sportivo Luqueño players
Deportes Tolima footballers
Carabobo F.C. players
Club Alianza Lima footballers
Estudiantes de Mérida players
Universidad de Chile footballers
Expatriate footballers in Chile
Expatriate footballers in Peru
Expatriate footballers in Colombia
Expatriate footballers in Venezuela
Association football midfielders